The Greece men's national field hockey team represents Greece in men's international field hockey competitions.

Tournament record

EuroHockey Championship III
2005 – 5th place
2015 – Withdrew

EuroHockey Championship IV
2009 – 4th place
2011 – 
2013 –

See also
Greece women's national field hockey team

References

National team
European men's national field hockey teams
Field hockey
Men's sport in Greece